ELL-associated factor 2 is a protein that in humans is encoded by the EAF2 gene. It is part of the EAF family of proteins.

References

Further reading